Alexandria Canal may refer to:

 Alexandria Canal (Virginia)
 Alexandra Canal (New South Wales)
 Mahmoudiyah Canal (Egypt), sometimes referred to as the "Canal of Alexandria" in old texts